Hais, Yemen   (حيس ) is a city in Hays District of  Ta'izz Governorate of Yemen.  In 2004 it had a population of a population of 15.016 people and is the 35th largest town in Yemen. 

The city is built on the Red Sea Coastal plain, adjacent to the Nakhlah Wadi(14.00185°N and 44.0001°E) and is a typical Arab town with maze road network and a main mosque.  The resort town of Khawkhah is downstream of Hais on the Red Sea Coast.

References
   

Taiz Governorate